The 2017–18 Pro B season was the 31st season of the Pro B, the top basketball league in France organised by the Ligue Nationale de Basket (LNB). Blois won its first league title.

Teams

Promotion and relegation
Orléans Loiret and SLUC Nancy entered the league after they relegated from the 2016–17 Pro A season. UJAP Quimper 29 and Caen Basket Calvados were promoted from the 2016–17 NM1 season.

Regular season
In the regular season, teams play against each other home-and-away in a round-robin format. The table leader will promote to the Pro A while the numbers two until nine qualify for the promotion playoffs. The last two placed teams are relegated to the NM1.

Standings

Promotion playoffs
The seven highest ranked seeds in the regular season, excluding the league champions, qualify for the promotion playoffs. They are joined by the winner of the LNB Pro B Leaders Cup. All rounds of the promotion playoffs are played in a best-of-three format.

Pro B Leaders Cup
The winner of the LNB Pro B Leaders Cup automatically qualified for the promotion playoffs as the top seeded team. The quarter- and semi-finals in the Leaders Cup are played in two-legged format. The Final was played on 18 February in Disneyland Paris. Prior to the final eight teams, teams played in six groups of three teams to determine which teams would qualify for the quarter-finals.

Individual awards

MVP of the Month

See also
2017–18 Pro A season

References

French
LNB Pro B